TCDD MT5700 is a series of 30 diesel railcars operated by the Turkish State Railways. They were produced by Fiat of Italy and are closely related to the slightly older MT5600 and Italian railcar ALn 668. This railcar has a three-speed hydrodynamic automatic transmission.

External links
 Trains on Turkey page on MT5700

Turkish State Railways railcars